Sam Weir is a former American football coach.  He served as the head football coach at the University of Central Florida for one season, in 1982, compiling a record of 0–10.

Head coaching record

References

Year of birth missing (living people)
Living people
UCF Knights football coaches